The Mayoral election of 1929 in Pittsburgh, Pennsylvania was held on Tuesday, November 5, 1929. Incumbent Republican mayor Charles H. Kline was re-elected over Thomas A. Dunn, who ran on the Democratic and Good Government party tickets. Until this election, no mayor of Pittsburgh had won consecutive terms since Henry A. Weaver in 1858, owing in part to a prior long-standing law prohibiting a mayor from succeeding himself. , this was the last time a Republican was elected mayor of Pittsburgh.

Primary elections

Prior to the Great Depression, Republicans dominated city politics. In this party's primary, Kline won a plurality of votes over Allegheny County Court of Common Pleas Judge Richard W. Martin and City Council President James F. Malone. Pittsburgh Chamber of Commerce president and future city police chief Dunn, although a registered Republican, entered the race as a Democrat and won that party's primary. Dunn also ran on a "Good Government" ticket, hoping to attract support from independents as well as disgruntled Republicans upset over corruption in the Kline government.

General election

Dunn failed to pull in enough independents to compensate for the anemic Democratic vote as Kline won easily, taking 28 of 30 wards.

Dunn received 29,838 votes on the Democratic ticket and 8,454 votes on the Good Government slate.

References

1929 Pennsylvania elections
1929
1929 United States mayoral elections
1920s in Pittsburgh
November 1929 events